The Plymouth Post Office Building is a historic former post office building in Plymouth, Massachusetts.  The building was designed by Oscar Wenderoth and built in 1914-15 by the Hanold-O'Brien Company for the federal government.  The two story brick Colonial Revival building, in addition to housing the main post office branch for the town, also housed other federal government offices on the upper floor.  In the 1960s the building was relegated to a branch post office.  It was listed on the National Register of Historic Places in 1986.  Formerly owned by Flamingo Realty Trust, the building was purchased by 1620 Capital, LLC, in September 2013.

See also 
National Register of Historic Places listings in Plymouth County, Massachusetts
List of United States post offices

References 

Government buildings completed in 1913
Post office buildings on the National Register of Historic Places in Massachusetts
Buildings and structures in Plymouth, Massachusetts
National Register of Historic Places in Plymouth County, Massachusetts
1913 establishments in Massachusetts